Mark is a village and civil parish which lies approximately  from Bridgwater,  from Axbridge, and  from Highbridge in the Sedgemoor district of the county of Somerset, England. It includes the hamlets of Yarrow and Southwick.

The Mark Yeo river has its source near the village.

Mark is home to two pubs, a village hall, a village stores and post office, the Ki-Aikido Federation of Great Britain and many clubs and societies, including a Youth Theatre group.

History

The origin of the name is believed to mean A boundary of property from the Old English mærc.

The estate was given to the Bishop of Wells by Edith of Wessex and with Wedmore was used to endow the deanery of Wells Cathedral by 1157 and continued until 1547.

Mark was part of the hundred of Bempstone.

Governance

The parish council has responsibility for local issues, including setting an annual precept (local rate) to cover the council's operating costs and producing annual accounts for public scrutiny. The parish council evaluates local planning applications and works with the local police, district council officers, and neighbourhood watch groups on matters of crime, security, and traffic. The parish council's role also includes initiating projects for the maintenance and repair of parish facilities, as well as consulting with the district council on the maintenance, repair, and improvement of highways, drainage, footpaths, public transport, and street cleaning. Conservation matters (including trees and listed buildings) and environmental issues are also the responsibility of the council.

The village falls within the non-metropolitan district of Sedgemoor, which was formed on 1 April 1974 under the Local Government Act 1972, having previously been part of Axbridge Rural District, which is responsible for local planning and building control, local roads, council housing, environmental health, markets and fairs, refuse collection and recycling, cemeteries and crematoria, leisure services, parks, and tourism.

Somerset County Council is responsible for running the largest and most expensive local services such as education, social services, libraries, main roads, public transport, policing and fire services, trading standards, waste disposal and strategic planning.

It is also part of the Wells county constituency represented in the House of Commons of the Parliament of the United Kingdom. It elects one Member of Parliament (MP) by the first past the post system of election.

Religious sites

The Parish Church of St Mark (or Holy Cross) dates from the 13th century, but is mainly 14th and 15th century, with further restoration in 1864. It has been designated by English Heritage as a Grade I listed building. The former market cross in the churchyard dates from the 15th century.

The Methodist Chapel on The Causeway dates from 1797.

Education
The educational system in the Cheddar Valley consists of First Schools for children between the ages of 4 and 9, two Middle Schools (ages 9 to 13) and a Secondary School for pupils up to the age of 18 years.
Children from Mark may attend Mark First School, Hugh Sexey Middle School in Blackford,
and The Kings of Wessex Academy in Cheddar.

Mark is home to Mark College, a private boarding secondary school for students with Asperger syndrome or high-functioning autism.

References

External links

 

Villages in Sedgemoor
Civil parishes in Somerset